Sinhŭng County is a mountainous county in South Hamgyŏng province, North Korea.

Geography
It is traversed by the Hamgyŏng and Palbong ranges. The highest point is Chailbong.  There are also lowland plains, where the temperatures are quite different from the mountains. The chief streams are the Sangch'ŏn and Pujŏn Rivers.

Administrative divisions
Sinhŭng county is divided into 1 ŭp (town), 3 rodongjagu (workers' districts) and 21 ri (villages):

Economy
Agriculture dominates the local economy. In the mountain regions, the crops include oats, potatoes, millet, and barnyard millet.  In the fertile areas in the south, rice is also grown. Lumbering and hydropower are also part of the local economy; relatively little mining takes place.

Ryu Kyong-su Tank Factory is located in the area.

Transportation
Sinhŭng is served by road and rail, and lies on the Sinhŭng line of the Korean State Railway.

Sinhung has a trolleybus network of about 4.1 km long. It is a single overhead bidirectional line with a potential passing loop built between 2013 and 2017. However, two trolleybuses have not operated at least since October 2013, while the third appears to have operated until 2017 though all three trolleybuses were removed from 2017 to 2019.

See also
Geography of North Korea
Administrative divisions of North Korea
South Hamgyong

References

External links
Sinhung Area Revolutionary Battle Sites picture album at Naenara

Counties of South Hamgyong